Elections to Havant Borough Council took place on 5 May 2022 as part of the 2022 United Kingdom local elections.

Results summary

Ward results

Barncroft

Battins

Bedhampton

Bondfields

Cowplain

Emsworth

Hart Plain

Hayling East

Hayling West

Purbrook

St. Faiths

Stakes

Warren Park

Waterloo

References

Havant
2022
2020s in Hampshire